Knut Engdahl (born 20 June 1933) is a Norwegian politician for the Conservative Party. He served as a deputy representative to the Norwegian Parliament from Møre og Romsdal during the 1977–1981 term. He was also mayor of Kristiansund municipality from 1981–1983.

References

1933 births
Living people
Deputy members of the Storting
Conservative Party (Norway) politicians
Mayors of places in Møre og Romsdal
Politicians from Kristiansund
Place of birth missing (living people)
20th-century Norwegian politicians